Sioux County is a county located in the U.S. state of Iowa. As of the 2020 census, the population was 35,872. Its county seat is Orange City. Its largest city is Sioux Center.

History
Sioux County was formed on January 15, 1851.  It has been self-governed since January 20, 1860.  It was named after the Sioux tribe.

The first county seat was Calliope in 1860, then a small village with 15 inhabitants, and now part of Hawarden.  The first courthouse was built here in 1860 and served as such until 1872.  A larger immigration wave began in 1869, primarily of Dutch.  In 1872, Orange City was declared the seat.  In June 1902, the construction began on a new Sioux County courthouse designed by W.W. Beach. Of red sandstone, it was completed in 1904, and still serves as the courthouse. From 1976 until 1982 the building was completely restored, and in 1977, it was listed on the National Register of Historic Places.

Geography

Western Sioux County drains to the south west to the Rock River or the Big Sioux River. Eastern Sioux County drains to the south east to the Floyd River.

Major highways
 U.S. Highway 18
 U.S. Highway 75
 Iowa Highway 10
 Iowa Highway 12
 Iowa Highway 60

Adjacent counties
Lyon County  (north)
O'Brien County  (east)
Plymouth County  (south)
Union County, South Dakota  (southwest)
Lincoln County, South Dakota  (northwest)

Demographics

2020 census
There were 13,000 housing units, of which 12,202 were occupied.

2010 census
There were 12,279 housing units, of which 11,584 were occupied.

2000 census

As of the census of 2000, there were 31,589 people, 10,693 households, and 8,062 families residing in the county.  The population density was 41 people per square mile (16/km2).  There were 11,260 housing units at an average density of 15 per square mile (6/km2).  The racial makeup of the county was 97.33% White, 0.20% Black or African American, 0.13% Native American, 0.59% Asian, 0.01% Pacific Islander, 1.20% from other races, and 0.53% from two or more races.  2.56% of the population were Hispanic or Latino of any race.

There were 10,693 households, out of which 36.80% had children under the age of 18 living with them, 69.40% were married couples living together, 4.20% had a female householder with no husband present, and 24.60% were non-families. 22.20% of all households were made up of individuals, and 11.40% had someone living alone who was 65 years of age or older.  The average household size was 2.71 and the average family size was 3.19.

In the county, the population was spread out, with 27.10% under the age of 18, 15.20% from 18 to 24, 23.50% from 25 to 44, 19.10% from 45 to 64, and 15.00% who were 65 years of age or older.  The median age was 33 years. For every 100 females there were 96.30 males.  For every 100 females age 18 and over, there were 93.50 males.

The median income for a household in the county was $40,536, and the median income for a family was $45,846. Males had a median income of $31,548 versus $19,963 for females. The per capita income for the county was $16,532.  About 4.60% of families and 6.40% of the population were below the poverty line, including 7.90% of those under age 18 and 6.80% of those age 65 or over.

At one time divorce was relatively uncommon. In 1980, 52 married people in the county existed per divorced person; this rate did not exist in the total United States since the 1930s. , this changed to 14 married persons per divorced person.

Religion
, 80% of the county residents belong to major denominational churches, compared to 36% of the total U.S. population.

Education
Sioux County is the home to two four-year liberal arts colleges; Northwestern College in Orange City and Dordt University in Sioux Center. Both of these schools have enrollments over 1,000. Northwest Iowa Community College is also in Sioux County, though it is most often associated with the community of Sheldon in O'Brien County.

Politics
Sioux County is overwhelmingly Republican in Presidential elections. The only Democratic presidential nominee to ever carry Sioux County since the Civil War has been Franklin D. Roosevelt, who did so in 1932 and 1936; however, Theodore Roosevelt won the county as a Progressive in 1912 and George B. McClellan carried the county in the wartime 1864 election. The Democrats have only garnered 40 percent of the county's vote once since Roosevelt. Further underlining the county's heavy Republican bent, in 1964 it was one of only seven counties in the state to support Barry Goldwater, who easily carried the county with almost 66 percent of the vote–a near-reversal of Lyndon Johnson's statewide margin. In addition, in 2008, when Barack Obama carried Iowa by 9.5 points, Sioux County was his weakest of all 99 counties in the state, with John McCain winning the county by 62 points. By 2020, the county at 66.5 point margin was Joe Biden's second-weakest county in Iowa, being overtaken by almost as equally Republican neighboring Lyon County at 67.5 points.

In 1992, Sioux County was one of only two counties in the nation, along with Jackson County, Kentucky, to give George H. W. Bush over seventy percent of its vote. In the six elections since then, the Republican candidates has never received less than 75 percent of the county's vote. It is located in what was, until 2013, Iowa's 5th congressional district which had a Cook Partisan Voting Index of R+9 and was represented by Republican Steve King.  King won the seat in Iowa's new 4th congressional district in the 2012 election with 53% of the district's vote, with 83% of Sioux County votes going for King.

Communities

Cities

Alton
Boyden
Chatsworth
Granville
Hawarden
Hospers
Hull
Ireton
Matlock
Maurice
Orange City
Rock Valley
Sheldon
Sioux Center

Townships

Buncombe
Capel
Center
Eagle
East Orange
Floyd
Garfield
Grant
Holland
Lincoln
Logan
Lynn
Nassau
Plato
Reading
Rock
Settlers
Sheridan
Sherman
Sioux
Washington
Welcome
West Branch

Population ranking
The population ranking of the following table is based on the 2020 census of Sioux County.

† county seat

Notable people
Vern Den Herder, member of the undefeated Miami Dolphins NFL team of 1972
Hope Emerson, American actress
Michael Franken, retired U.S. Navy Vice Admiral, won Iowa's 2022 U.S Senate Democratic Primary
Stanley L. Greigg, member of the U.S. House of Representatives
Brian Hansen, former NFL punter
Charles B. Hoeven, U.S. Representative
Millie Jeffrey, pioneer for workers', civil and women's rights
James Kennedy, American historian
Stephen Mitchell
Nancy Metcalf, professional volleyball player
Albert Meyer
Dennis A. Muilenburg, Former Boeing President & CEO
Dennis Marion Schnurr, Archbishop of the Roman Catholic Archdiocese of Cincinnati
Robert H. Schuller, American televangelist, pastor, and author
Ruth Suckow, American author
Melvin D. Synhorst, former Iowa Secretary of State
Delwin Vriend, LGBT rights icon
Anna Johnson Pell Wheeler, American mathematician
Adam Gregg, Current Iowa Lieutenant Governor

See also

National Register of Historic Places listings in Sioux County, Iowa

References

External links

Sioux County government website

 
Iowa placenames of Native American origin
Dutch-American culture in Iowa
1851 establishments in Iowa
Populated places established in 1851